Ralfsiaceae is a family of brown algae in the order Ralfsiales.

Species
A 2014 classification of brown algae included the following genera:

Analipus Kjellman, 1889
Endoplura Hollenberg, 1969
Heterochordaria Setchell & N.L.Gardner, 1924
Heteroralfsia  H.Kawai, 1989
Ralfsia Berkeley, 1843

See also
Ralfsia verrucosa

References

Ralfsiales
Brown algae families